Designboom (stylized as designboom) is a daily web magazine covering the fields of industrial design, architecture, and art internationally. Launched in 1999, and headquartered in Milan, the publication was the first web magazine to focus on these fields, and it features interviews and firsthand studio visits of renowned designers and architects, in addition to coverage of international design fairs and new projects. Newsletters are published daily.

The online magazine was named one of the top 100 design influencers in the world by Time magazine, as well as one of the top "Les 100 qui comptent" ("People who count") by the American magazine Architectural Digest. Designboom runs several international design competitions each year, in partnership with large companies. In addition, Designboom hosts young designers "marts" at a range of furniture and design fairs, an exhibition format that it introduced in 2005 at the International Contemporary Furniture Fair in New York City, and which has since become an industry standard.

In 2010, Designboom China was launched.

In 2012, Designboom itself became a subject of media attention for its defense of Takeshi Miyakawa when the artist was arrested and held on Riker's Island for a controversial street installation in New York City. Miyakawa was collaborating with Designboom on a lighting installation for the International Contemporary Furniture Fair at the time.

References

External links
 

Online magazines published in the United States
Design magazines
Magazines established in 1999
Internet properties established in 1999
1999 establishments in Italy